Naushon Island is the largest of the Elizabeth Islands in southeastern Massachusetts. It is part of the town of Gosnold, Massachusetts, and is owned by the Forbes family. As of the 2000 census, the island had a permanent population of 30 people.

The island is seven miles (11 km) long and 7.4 square miles in land area (19.18 km²). It is separated from Cape Cod by a narrow strait and the smaller islands of Uncatena and Nonamesset, and is located four statute miles (6 km) northwest of Martha's Vineyard.

History

Naushon Island has been a Forbes family retreat for more than a century and a half, since its purchase by John Murray Forbes.  Forbes was a businessman who began his career in his family's opium and tea trading business in China, and made much of his fortune by investing in the early development of railroads. Naushon Island was purchased by Forbes and a business associate, William W. Swain, in 1842, and Forbes purchased Swain's share soon after to become the sole owner. Upon his death in 1898, Forbes left Naushon in a trust administered by his 5 surviving children and it is now owned by Naushon Island Trust, Inc. Pasque Island and Nashawena Island, the next two islands in the Elizabeth Island chain, were purchased at different times by J. M. Forbes descendants and remain privately owned. There are approximately 35 houses on Naushon, most near the east end.

Naushon Island was at one time the property of James Bowdoin III (1752–1811), son of Massachusetts' governor James Bowdoin II (1726–1790) and appointed by President Thomas Jefferson to serve as the U.S. plenipotentiary to Spain. James III owned a beautiful estate at "Nashaun Island," according to Thomas Bridgman who in 1856 published The Pilgrims of Massachusetts and Their Descendants. Bridgman also notes that Bowdoin was "among the very earliest as well as largest importers of the pure Merino stock and took great pains in improving his own flocks and inculcating the importance of doing so upon others".  This interest may have led to the wool sample found among Thomas Jefferson's papers. Jefferson's note reads "Specimen of Mr. Bowdoin's wool, from American sheep raised on his Island of "Nanshaw". The note has been digitized and is available for viewing in the Library of Congress American Memories Collection , indexed as "Hackley and Bowdoin, no date, wool samples".

John Forbes Kerry, a former U.S. senator and the U.S. secretary of State from 2013 to 2017, is not a direct descendant of John Murray Forbes but of his uncle,  but nonetheless has vacationed on Naushon periodically since his youth.

Topography
Naushon and the smaller islands that surround it, Uncatena, Nonamesset, Monohansett, Bull, Cedar, Bachelor, Veckatimest, Weepecket, and some smaller ones, are private property and closed to the public, with the exception of three beaches, Kettle Cove, West Beach, and Tarpaulin Cove, and Weepeckit Island, off the north shore of Naushon, in Buzzards Bay. Opening to the east northeast, Hadley Harbor, on the east end of Naushon, is relatively deep and is well protected from storms. At the mouth of Hadley Harbor, Bull Island is open to picnickers. Other bays include Inner Harbor, Lackeys Bay, Monsod Bay, and Northwest Gutter. On Naushon, there are no paved roads but many miles of trails through the mostly beech woods. A lighthouse sits above Tarpaulin Cove.

Gallery

References

External links
Cuttyhunk Historical Society, the Museum of the Elizabeth Islands  

Elizabeth Islands
Forbes family residences
Coastal islands of Massachusetts
Populated coastal places in Massachusetts
Private islands of Massachusetts